Jérôme Carcopino (27 June 1881 – 17 March 1970) was a French historian and author. He was the fifteenth member elected to occupy seat 3 of the Académie française, in 1955.

Biography
Carcopino was born at Verneuil-sur-Avre, Eure, son of a doctor from a Corsican family related to Bonaparte, and educated at the École Normale Supérieure where he specialised in history.  From 1904 to 1907 he was a member of the French School in Rome.  In 1912 he was a professor of history in Le Havre.  In 1912 he became a lecturer at the University of Algiers and inspector of antiquities in Algeria until 1920.  His career was interrupted by World War I when he served in the Dardanelles.  He became a professor at the Sorbonne in 1920 until 1937 when he became Director of the French School in Rome. From 25 February 1941 to 18 April 1942 he was the Minister of National Education and Youth in the government of Vichy France. He was a member of many archaeological and historical institutes in Europe.

Bibliography
 
 
 
 
 
 )

References

External links
 

1881 births
1970 deaths
People from Eure
École Normale Supérieure alumni
Academic staff of the University of Paris
French classical scholars
French military personnel of World War I
Recipients of the Croix de Guerre 1914–1918 (France)
Historians of antiquity
20th-century French historians
Officiers of the Légion d'honneur
Members of the Académie Française
Members of the Académie des Inscriptions et Belles-Lettres
French people of Corsican descent
French Ministers of National Education
French scholars of Roman history